Eucalyptus jucunda, commonly known as Yuna mallee, is a species of mallee or small tree that is endemic to Western Australia. It has smooth bark, lance-shaped to curved adult leaves, flowering buds in groups of seven or nine, white or cream-coloured flowers and barrel-shaped or shortened spherical fruit with an unusually narrow opening.

Description
It has smooth greyish to creamy brown bark, sometimes with crumbly, fibrous, flaky or ribbony bark at the base. Young plants and coppice regrowth have glaucous, sessile leaves arranged in opposite pairs. Flowering occurs from January to April and the flowers are white, cream-coloured or yellow.

Taxonomy and naming
Eucalyptus jucunda was first formally described in 1964 by Charles Gardner from a specimen he collected near the Greenough River in 1959. The description was published in Journal of the Royal Society of Western Australia. The specific epithet (jucunda) is a Latin word meaning 'pleasant'.

Distribution and habitat
Yuna mallee usually grows in sandy soil on sandplains between Mingenew and Kalbarri in the Avon Wheatbelt, Carnarvon, Geraldton Sandplains and Yalgoo biogeographic regions.

Conservation status
This eucalypt is classified as "not threatened" by the Western Australian Government Department of Parks and Wildlife.

See also
List of Eucalyptus species

References

Eucalypts of Western Australia
jucunda
Myrtales of Australia
Plants described in 1964
Taxa named by Charles Gardner